Gloria Purvis is an African-American Catholic speaker, author, podcaster, and Whole Life activist in Washington, D.C. She is best known for her time co-hosting the Morning Glory show on EWTN Radio, which ended in December 2020 when the show was abruptly canceled.  Purvis was not given a reason for the cancellation, which was part of "a year-end spate of changes at EWTN." As of late 2021, she hosts the Gloria Purvis Podcast  in collaboration with America Media.

She is also the inaugural Pastoral Fellow for the University of Notre Dame's Office of Life and Human Dignity (NDOLHD) at the McGrath Institute for Church Life. The University of Portland awarded Purvis a Doctorate in Humane Letters Honora Causa in 2022.

Purvis did an interview in May 2022 with Archbishop Salvatore Cordileone. She questions  him about his reasons for banning Speaker of the House, Nancy Pelosi, from communion.

Media appearances
Purvis has been featured in The New York Times, the National Catholic Reporter,  Newsweek, and Catholic News Service. She has also been a featured guest on PBS NewsHour and Fox News.
She was interviewed by Robert P. George for the Witherspoon Institute's online journal Public Discourse.

References

Living people
African-American Catholics
American radio hosts
American podcasters
American anti-abortion activists
American anti-racism activists
African-American radio personalities
African-American journalists
American consistent life ethics activists
American women radio journalists
American women podcasters
African-American women journalists
African-American activists
Year of birth missing (living people)